In phonetics and phonology, a semivowel, glide or semiconsonant is a sound that is phonetically similar to a vowel sound but functions as the syllable boundary, rather than as the nucleus of a syllable. Examples of semivowels in English are the consonants y and w, in yes and west, respectively. Written  in IPA, y and w are near to the vowels ee and oo in seen and moon, written  in IPA. The term glide may alternatively refer to any type of transitional sound, not necessarily a semivowel.

Classification
Semivowels form a subclass of approximants. Although "semivowel" and "approximant" are sometimes treated as synonymous, most authors use the term "semivowel" for a more restricted set; there is no universally agreed-upon definition, and the exact details may vary from author to author. For example,  do not consider the labiodental approximant  to be a semivowel, while  proposes that it should be considered one.

In the International Phonetic Alphabet, the diacritic attached to non-syllabic vowel letters is an inverted breve placed below the symbol representing the vowel: . When there is no room for the tack under a symbol, it may be written above, using .

Additionally, there are dedicated symbols for four semivowels that correspond to the four close cardinal vowel sounds:

The pharyngeal approximant  is also equivalent to the semivowel articulation of the open back unrounded vowel .

As mentioned above, the labiodental approximant  is considered a semivowel in some treatments.

Contrast with vowels
Semivowels, by definition, contrast with vowels by being non-syllabic. In addition, they are usually shorter than vowels. In languages as diverse as Amharic, Yoruba, and Zuni, semivowels are produced with a narrower constriction in the vocal tract than their corresponding vowels. Nevertheless, semivowels may be phonemically equivalent with vowels. For example, the English word fly can be considered either as an open syllable ending in a diphthong  or as a closed syllable ending in a consonant .

The diphthong is analyzed as a single segment, and the approximant-vowel sequence is analyzed as two separate segments.

 has a greater duration than 

Contrast with fricatives/spirant approximants
According to the standard definitions, semivowels (such as ) contrast with fricatives (such as ) in that fricatives produce turbulence, but semivowels do not. In discussing Spanish, Martínez Celdrán suggests setting up a third category of "spirant approximant", contrasting both with semivowel approximants and with fricatives. Though the spirant approximant is more constricted (having a lower F2 amplitude), longer, and unspecified for rounding (viuda  'widow' vs. ayuda  'help'), the distributional overlap is limited. The spirant approximant can only appear in the syllable onset (including word-initially, where the semivowel never appears). The two overlap in distribution after  and : enyesar  ('to plaster') aniego  ('flood') and although there is dialectal and idiolectal variation, speakers may also exhibit other near-minimal pairs like abyecto ('abject') vs. abierto ('opened'). One potential minimal pair (depending on dialect) is ya visto  ('already seen') vs. y ha visto  ('and he has seen').
Again, it is not present in all dialects. Other dialects differ in either merging the two or enhancing the contrast by moving the former to another place of articulation, like in Rioplatense Spanish.

See also
 Diphthong
 Hiatus (linguistics)
 List of phonetics topics
 Mater lectionis
 Syllabic consonant
 Voiced labio-velar approximant

References

Sources

Further reading

 

Manner of articulation
Vowels
Approximant consonants

fi:Puolivokaali